Layden may refer to:
Elmer Layden, former Commissioner of the National Football League and head football coach at University of Notre Dame
Frank Layden, a former coach and executive of the Utah Jazz
Gene Layden, a Major League Baseball outfielder
Matt Layden, an American designer and builder of small sailboats
Penny Layden, a British Actor
Pete Layden, a Major League Baseball outfielder
Scott Layden, an assistant general manager with the San Antonio Spurs
Tim Layden, senior writer for Sports Illustrated